Benjamin Dawkins may refer to:

 Ben Dawkins, Australian politician of the Western Australian Legislative Council
 Benjamin C. Dawkins Sr. (1881–1966), U.S. District Judge for the Western District of Louisiana, 5th Circuit, appointed by Woodrow Wilson
 Benjamin C. Dawkins Jr. (1911–1984), son of the above, and successor to the seat of U.S. District Judge, same district, appointed by President Calvin Coolidge
 Benjamin Dawkins, British person in the late 18th Century, who purchased Sadler's Mill from Henry Temple, 1st Viscount Palmerston